Kathleen Bruce may refer to:

 Kathleen Scott (1878–1947), née Bruce, British sculptor
 Kathleen Bruce (historian) (1885–1950), American historian